Devon Amoo-Mensah (born November 27, 1995) is an American soccer player who plays as a defender for Detroit City FC in the USL Championship.

References

External links

1995 births
Living people
American soccer players
Association football defenders
Detroit City FC players
Soccer players from Illinois
USL Championship players